La Portada Formation is a geologic formation of Miocene and Pliocene age located near the Coast Range of northern Chile. The coarse-grained sandstones of the formation contain penguin fossils.

See also 
 Cerro Ballena
 Coquimbo Formation
 Navidad Formation

References

Further reading 
 L. Ragaini, C. di Celma, and G. Cantalamessa. 2008. Warm-water mollusc assemblages from northern Chile (Mejillones Peninsula): new evidence for permanent El Nino-like conditions during Pliocene warmth?. Journal of the Geological Society 165:1075-1084

Geologic formations of Chile
Geology of the Chilean Coast Range
Miocene Series of South America
Pliocene Series of South America
Neogene Chile
Sandstone formations
Geology of Antofagasta Region